Scow can refer to:

Boats
 Scow, a type of boat including the following versions:
 Garbage scow, for hauling refuse
 A-Scow, 38 feet long
 E-Scow, 28 feet long
 C-Scow, 20 feet long
 I-20 (sailing scow) 20 feet long
 MC Scow, 16 feet long
 M Scow, 16 feet long

Wrecks
 Niagara Scow, near Niagara Falls
 Success (shipwreck), a wreck in Lake Michigan near Wisconsin

People
 Alfred Scow (1927-2013), Aboriginal-Canadian lawyer and judge
 Kate Scow, US professor of soil science and microbial ecology

See also

 
 Scowl (disambiguation)
 Scour (disambiguation)